Rosalinda Celentano (born 15 July 1968) is an Italian actress. Credited in over twenty films, she is perhaps best known for having played Satan in the movie The Passion of the Christ (2004). She is the daughter of Adriano Celentano and Claudia Mori.

References

External links

1968 births
Italian film actresses
Living people
Actresses from Rome
20th-century Italian actresses
Italian LGBT actors
Bisexual actresses